Björn Larsson (born May 12, 1975) is a Swedish game director, executive producer and game designer. Björn founded Iridon Interactive in 1998 publishing and producing titles including Total Soccer 2000 and Pure Pinball. In 2004, Björn rebranded Iridon to Legendo Entertainment to focus on computer and video games based on myths and historical events. Notable titles include The Three Musketeers and Attack on Pearl Harbor.

Games

1997 – Dink Smallwood (PC)
1998 – Excessive Speed (PC)
1999 – Total Soccer 2000 (PC)
2000 – Akimbo: Kung-Fu Hero (PC)
2002 – Turble Turtle Adventure (GBA)
2004 – Pure Pinball (Xbox)
2007 – Attack on Pearl Harbor (Windows XP and Windows Vista)
2009 – The Three Musketeers: One for all! (WiiWare) 
2010 – Pearl Harbor Trilogy - 1941: Red Sun Rising (WiiWare)
2011 – Ghost Mania (WiiWare)
2011 – The Three Musketeers: One for all! (Mac App Store)
2012 – Fortune Winds: Ancient Trader (Mac App Store)
2017 - Flying Tigers: Shadows over China (PC)

References

External links 

Nintendo UK interviews Bjorn Larsson on Pearl Harbor Trilogy - 1941: Red Sun Rising
Interview with Björn Larsson re The Three Musketeers WiiWare on NintendoLife
The official web site of Legendo Entertainment
Interview with Björn Larsson on Gaming Nexus
 
Intervista a Bjorn Larsson, sul portale RAI Letteratura

1975 births
Swedish video game designers
Living people
Video game producers
Prix Médicis étranger winners